Ludvík Vyhnanovský (1927-2010) was a male Czech international table tennis player.

Table tennis career
He won seven World Table Tennis Championship medals from 1953 to 1959. He won four team event medals, two men's doubles titles with Václav Tereba and Ladislav Štípek and one mixed doubles title with Helen Elliot.
Ludvik was 10 times Champion of Czechoslovakia.

Personal life
In 2005 he received the Czech S.C.I. Award.

See also
 List of table tennis players
 List of World Table Tennis Championships medalists

References

Czech male table tennis players
1927 births
2010 deaths
Sportspeople from Prague
World Table Tennis Championships medalists